Bocula hedleyi is a moth of the family Erebidae first described by Jeremy Daniel Holloway in 2005. It is found in Borneo.

The wingspan is 14–16 mm.

References

Rivulinae